Ravinia is a genus of flesh flies in the family Sarcophagidae. There are at least 30 described species in Ravinia.

Species
These 37 species belong to the genus Ravinia:

 Ravinia acerba (Walker, 1849) i c g
 Ravinia advena (Walker, 1853) c g
 Ravinia almaqahia Lehrer, 2005 c g
 Ravinia anandra (Dodge, 1956) i c g
 Ravinia assidua (Walker, 1852) i c g
 Ravinia aureopyga (Hall, 1928) c g
 Ravinia aurigena (Townsend, 1912) c g
 Ravinia auromaculata (Townsend, 1915) c g
 Ravinia barroi (Dodge, 1956) c g
 Ravinia belforti (Prado & Fonseca, 1932) c g
 Ravinia coachellensis (Hall, 1931) i c g
 Ravinia columbiana (Lopes, 1962) c g
 Ravinia dampfi (Lopes, 1946) c g
 Ravinia derelicta (Walker, 1852) i c g
 Ravinia effrenata (Walker, 1861) i c g
 Ravinia errabunda (Wulp, 1896) i c g
 Ravinia floridensis (Aldrich, 1916) i c g
 Ravinia globulus (Aldrich, 1916) c g
 Ravinia heithausi Lopes, 1975 c g
 Ravinia laakei (Hall, 1931) i c g
 Ravinia latisetosa Parker, 1914 i c g b
 Ravinia lherminieri Robineau-desvoidy i c g
 Ravinia meinckeae (Blanchard, 1939) c g
 Ravinia ochracea (Aldrich, 1916) i c g
 Ravinia ollantaytambensis (Hall, 1928) c g
 Ravinia pectinata (Aldrich, 1916) i c g
 Ravinia pernix (Harris, 1780) c g
 Ravinia planifrons (Aldrich, 1916) i c g
 Ravinia postnoda (Dodge, 1968) c g
 Ravinia pusiola (Wulp, 1928) i c g
 Ravinia quadrivittata (Macquart, 1843) c g
 Ravinia querula (Walker, 1849) i c g
 Ravinia rufipes (Townsend, 1917) c g
 Ravinia stimulans (Walker, 1849) i c g
 Ravinia sueta (Wulp, 1896) i c g
 Ravinia tancituro Roback, 1952 c g
 Ravinia vagabunda (Wulp, 1895) c g

Data sources: i = ITIS, c = Catalogue of Life, g = GBIF, b = Bugguide.net

References

Further reading

 

Sarcophagidae
Articles created by Qbugbot